The Csardas Princess is a 1951 German musical film directed by Georg Jacoby and starring Marika Rökk, Johannes Heesters and Hubert Marischka. It is based on the 1915 operetta The Csardas Princess and is part of the tradition of operetta films.

It was shot at the Bendestorf Studios and on location in Taormina, Rome and Paris. The film's sets were designed by the art director Erich Kettelhut. It was shot in agfacolor.

Jacoby had previously directed an earlier version in 1934 starring Marta Eggerth.

Cast
Marika Rökk as Sylva Varescu
Johannes Heesters as Edwin von Weylersheim
Hubert Marischka as Feri von Kerekes
Walter Müller as Boni Kancsianu
Jeanette Schultze as Stasi Planitz
Margarete Slezak as Mathilde von Weylersheim
Franz Schafheitlin as Leopold von Weylersheim
Arno Assmann as Mac Grave
Helmuth Rudolph as Gesandter

References

External links

1951 musical films
German musical films
West German films
Films directed by Georg Jacoby
Operetta films
Films based on operettas
Films shot in Rome
Films shot in Paris
1950s German films